Benzothiazole is an aromatic heterocyclic compound with the chemical formula . It is colorless, slightly viscous liquid. Although the parent compound, benzothiazole is not widely used, many of its derivatives are found in commercial products or in nature. Firefly luciferin can be considered a derivative of benzothiazole.

Structure and preparation
Benzothiazoles consist of a 5-membered 1,3-thiazole ring fused to a benzene ring. The nine atoms of the bicycle and the attached substituents are coplanar.

Benzothiazoles are prepared by treatment of 2-mercaptoaniline with acid chlorides:
C6H4(NH2)SH  +  RC(O)Cl  →   C6H4(NH)SCR  +  HCl  +  H2O

Uses
Benzothiazole occurs naturally in some foods but is also used as a food additive. It has a sulfurous odor and meaty flavor. The European Food Safety Authority assessment had "no safety concern at estimated levels of intake as a flavouring substance".

The heterocyclic core of the molecule is readily substituted at the unique methyne centre in the thiazole ring. It is a thermally stable electron-withdrawing moiety with numerous applications in dyes such as thioflavin. Some drugs contain this group, examples being riluzole and pramipexole. Accelerators for the sulfur vulcanization of rubber are based on 2-mercaptobenzothiazoles. This ring is a potential component in nonlinear optics (NLO). A benzothiazole derivative is suggested as a dye for arsenic detection.

See also
 Benzothiazoles are related to thiazoles, which lack the fused benzene ring.
 Benzoxazoles, which substitute an oxygen for the sulfur atom.

References

External links
 MSDS

 
Aromatic bases
Simple aromatic rings